John William Cox (May 9, 1929 – May 14, 2017) was an American football end in the National Football League (NFL) for the Washington Redskins.  He played college football at Duke University and was drafted in the eighth round of the 1951 NFL Draft.

Cox was inducted into the Duke Sports Hall of Fame in 1978. He died on May 14, 2017.

References

1929 births
2017 deaths
People from Mount Airy, North Carolina
American football wide receivers
Duke Blue Devils football players
Washington Redskins players